Sweatt v. Painter, 339 U.S. 629 (1950), was a U.S. Supreme Court case that successfully challenged the "separate but equal" doctrine of racial segregation established by the 1896 case Plessy v. Ferguson. The case was influential in the landmark case of Brown v. Board of Education four years later.

The case involved a black man, Heman Marion Sweatt, who was refused admission to the School of Law of the University of Texas, whose president was Theophilus Painter, on the grounds that the Texas State Constitution prohibited integrated education.  The court ruled in favor of law student Sweatt, reasoning that the state's racially separate law school was inherently unequal. The decision was delivered on the same day as another case involving similar issues, McLaurin v. Oklahoma State Regents, also decided in favor of integrated graduate education.

Procedural history
The state district court in Travis County, Texas, instead of granting the plaintiff a writ of mandamus, continued the case for six months.  This allowed the state time to create a law school only for black students, which it established in Houston, rather than in Austin.  The 'separate' law school and the college became the Thurgood Marshall School of Law at Texas Southern University (known then as "Texas State University for Negroes").

The Dean of the Law School at the time was Charles T. McCormick. He wanted a separate law school for black students.

Texas Attorney General at the time was Price Daniel who advocated fiercely for racial segregation.

The trial court decision was affirmed by the Court of Civil Appeals and the Texas Supreme Court denied writ of error on further appeal.  Sweatt and the NAACP next went to the federal courts, and the case ultimately reached the U.S. Supreme Court.  Robert L. Carter and Thurgood Marshall presented Sweatt's case.

U.S. Supreme Court
The Supreme Court reversed the lower court decision, saying that the separate school failed to qualify, both because of quantitative differences in facilities and experiential factors, such as its isolation from most of the future lawyers with whom its graduates would interact.  The court held that, when considering graduate education, experience must be considered as part of "substantive equality."  The documentation of the court's decision includes the following differences identified between white and black facilities:
 The University of Texas Law School had 16 full-time and 3 part-time professors, while the black law school had 5 full-time professors.
 The University of Texas Law School had 850 students and a law library of 65,000 volumes, while the black law school had 23 students and a library of 16,500 volumes.
 The University of Texas Law School had moot court facilities, an Order of the Coif affiliation, and numerous graduates involved in public and private law practice, while the black law school had only one practice court facility and only one graduate admitted to the Texas Bar.

Legacy
On June 14, 2005, the Travis County Commissioners voted to rename the courthouse as The Heman Marion Sweatt Travis County Courthouse in honor of Sweatt's endeavor and victory.

See also

List of United States Supreme Court cases, volume 339
 Sipuel v. Board of Regents of Univ. of Okla. - 
 McLaurin v. Oklahoma State Regents -

References

Further reading

External links
 
 
Sweatt v. Painter archive

United States equal protection case law
United States Supreme Court cases
United States Supreme Court cases of the Vinson Court
1950 in United States case law
1950 in education
University of Texas at Austin
African-American history between emancipation and the civil rights movement
Civil rights movement case law
20th-century American trials
Education in Texas
Legal history of Texas
United States school desegregation case law
1950 in Texas
University of Texas School of Law
Thurgood Marshall